Ballot Measure 36 was a 2004 initiative in the U.S. state of Oregon. It amended the Oregon Constitution to define marriage as a union of one man and one woman. The initiative passed with 1,028,546 votes in favor, and 787,556 votes against (57% to 43%) in the November 2, 2004 general election.
It is one of a number of U.S. state constitutional amendments banning same-sex unions.

On May 19, 2014, the measure was declared unconstitutional by a U.S. federal district court judge, who ruled that it violated the Equal Protection Clause of the Fourteenth Amendment to the United States Constitution.

Results

Amendment to Constitution 
Measure 36 added the following text to Article 15 of the Oregon Constitution, as Section 5a:

Political context 
The measure was placed on the ballot through an initiative petition brought by the Oregon Defense of Marriage Coalition, a group dedicated to "preserving marriage as a union only between one man and one woman." The group was formed in reaction to same-sex marriages performed in Multnomah County and Benton County after their respective county commissions interpreted the Oregon Constitution and Oregon law as authorizing the issuing of marriage licenses to same-sex couples. Supporters of the measure, in addition to opposing same-sex marriage on principle, were also angry by the controversial means by which the Multnomah County Commission had come to its decision: no public hearings were held before the commission voted to allow the marriages and one of the commissioners, Lonnie Roberts, was not informed of the move until after the other commissioners began issuing licenses. Roberts criticized the "clandestine way" that the decision was made and speculated that he had not been included in the discussion because the other commissioners knew that he wouldn't support their decision. Supporters also wanted to prevent the state courts from coming to the same conclusion as the county commissions—that the state constitution and law required the government to license same-sex marriage—before several standing civil rights lawsuits on the issue could be resolved.

Basic Rights Oregon led the campaign against Measure 36. Opponents of the measure made several arguments. Many were supporters of same-sex marriage. In addition, some argued that regardless of voters' feelings on same-sex marriage, the state constitution was an inappropriate place to dictate marriage policy, which should have been statutory. Opponents also argued that the measure added discriminatory language to the state constitution, which, they predicted, would later be seen in the same negative light as earlier constitutional language against African Americans. They also feared that the measure could be used as a legal basis for denying benefits to same-sex couples which are automatically granted to heterosexual married couples.

According to Daniel June in JD Journal, Judge Harry Pregerson effectively undermined the ban by declaring it unconstitutional, when he ruled in favor of Allison Clark that she should receive the same work benefits with her homosexual partner as heterosexual couples would receive.

On May 19, 2014, United States District Judge Michael McShane ruled that Oregon's constitutional ban on same-sex marriage was unconstitutional. Since then, same-sex marriage has been legally recognized in Oregon.

Satirical arguments
Marvin Dennis Moore, a Portland church organist, wrote satirical arguments on several Oregon ballot measures, including Measure 36. Moore's arguments, ostensibly in favor of the measure, were printed in the official voters' pamphlet. For example, reacting to some supporters' claims that the purpose of marriage is for procreation, he argues that "couples who fail to conceive within two years ought to have their marriage licenses revoked." Measure 36 supporters criticized the placement of Moore's arguments in the "Arguments in Favor" section of the pamphlet, but the Oregon Secretary of State's Office countered they had no choice under the law but to print his arguments as specified.

See also
 Same-sex marriage in Oregon
 List of Oregon ballot measures
 Same-sex marriage in the United States
 Same-sex marriage legislation in the United States
 Same-sex marriage in the United States by state
 Same-sex marriage in the United States public opinion
 Same-sex marriage status in the United States by state
 List of benefits of marriage in the United States
 Defense of Marriage Act
 Marriage Protection Act
 Federal Marriage Amendment
 Domestic partnerships in the United States
 Freedom to Marry Coalition
 History of civil marriage in the U.S.
 Lon Mabon
 Karen Minnis

References

External links 
 Oregon Voter's Guide page for Measure 36--includes ballot title, text of the measure, and arguments for and against (including satirical arguments)
 Oregon Department of Justice page devoted to same-sex marriage

2004 in LGBT history
Amendments to the Constitution of Oregon
Initiatives in the United States
2004 Oregon ballot measures
U.S. state constitutional amendments banning same-sex unions
Same-sex marriage ballot measures in the United States